The Czernowitz Synagogue was a domed, Moorish Revival synagogue built in 1873 in Czernowitz, Austria-Hungary (today Chernivtsi, Ukraine). The synagogue was closed in 1940 and serves as a movie theater today.

History 
The original building was designed by architect Julian Zachariewicz (1873–78).

The synagogue was confiscated and closed by the Soviet government after annexing Northern Bukovina and its largest city, Czernowitz, from Romania in 1940. The building was burned by German and Romanian soldiers in 1941, after Nazi-allied Romania retook the city. After World War II the Soviet authorities tried to blow up the destroyed temple, but the building survived. In 1959, the outer walls were used to partially reconstruct the building for use as a movie theater that was named  ('October', in honor of the October Revolution). The building lost its dome and retains very little of its former appearance. After the fall of the Soviet Union the theater lost its Soviet name and was renamed "Chernivtsi".

Joseph Schmidt sang in the choir as a boy and served as cantor as an adult.

Other synagogues in Chernivtsi 

On September 25, 2001, a synagogue was opened in Chernivtsi. The Sadovsky Street Synagogue, closed by the Soviet Regime, was renovated, reopened, and also serves the Jewish Community Center.

References

External links
 
 Old Czernowitz Photos. Tempelgasse - Старі фото Чернівців. Вулиця Університетська до Темплю, Edward Tur.
 

Former synagogues in Ukraine
Moorish Revival synagogues
Synagogues completed in 1873
Buildings and structures in Chernivtsi
Bukovina Jews
Synagogues destroyed by Nazi Germany
Culture in Chernivtsi
Synagogue buildings with domes